The Movement is the second solo studio album by American rapper and Wu-Tang Clan member Inspectah Deck. It was released on June 10, 2003 through Koch Records. Production was handled by Phantom of the Beats, Ayatollah, Arabian Knight and Falling Down, with Inspectah Deck serving as executive producer and Saadiq Busby as associate executive producer. It features guest appearances from Killa Sin, Kool G Rap, Mojehan and Streetlife. The album peaked at number 137 on the Billboard 200 and number 29 on the Top R&B/Hip-Hop Albums in the United States.

A departure from Uncontrolled Substance'''s darker, soul-inspired sound, The Movement is more upbeat and expressive.  According to Inspectah Deck, "Uncontrolled Substance was just me as an ill lyricist wanting to put an album out. I just wanted to be heard. The Movement'' is like is me behind the scenes, behind everything. I'm doing … everything. All the credits got Inspectah Deck on it this time. I was able to put my soul into it".

Track listing

Personnel 
 Jason "Inspectah Deck" Hunter – main performer, executive producer
 Patrick "Streetlife" Charles – featured performer (track 8)
 Nathaniel "Kool G Rap" Wilson – featured performer (track 10)
 Jeryl "Killa Sin" Grant – featured performer (track 10)
 Mojehan – featured performer (track 16)
 Carlos "Phantom of the Beats" Evans – producer (tracks: 2-4, 9-11, 15)
 Lamont "Ayatollah" Dorrell – producer (tracks: 5, 6, 8, 12-14)
 Suleyman "Arabian Knight" Ansari – producer (track 7)
 Marc "Falling Down" McWilliams – producer (track 16)
 Saadiq Busby – associate executive producer
 Rock Logic – mixing
 Jeff Chenault – art direction, design
 Daragh McDonagh – photography

Charts

References

External links

2003 albums
Inspectah Deck albums
Albums produced by Ayatollah
E1 Music albums
MNRK Music Group albums